The Hep Stars (also known as just Hep Stars) is the eponymous second studio album (and third overall album release) by Swedish pop group Hep Stars, released on 19 December 1966 on Åke Gerhard's Olga Records, carrying the catalogue number LPO 04. The album can be considered the band's musical breakthrough, as five out of twelve tracks are original compositions, and nine out of the twelve tracks had never previously been recorded by other bands.

Nonetheless, with over 40.000 copies of the album being sent to record stores across Scandinavia, it became a huge hit, reaching number 12 on Kvällstoppen in Sweden, number 5 on Norway's VG-lista and number 3 in Finland, where it stayed for two months. The album was later certified gold in Sweden after selling 25.000 copies.

Material 
In contrast to their heavier and more rhythm and blues based sound of their debut album We And Our Cadillac, songs on The Hep Stars varies between pop on songs such as "Lady Lady" to psychedelia on "Consolation". The album also marks keyboardist Benny Andersson's songwriting debut, as five tracks on it are credited to him. "Isn't It Easy To Say" is also the first collaboration by him and future ABBA-bandmate Björn Ulvaeus. The album features an English version of "Last Night I Had the Strangest Dream", a song Hep Stars previously had a hit with in Sweden with a Swedish translation called "I Natt Jag Drömde".

"No Time" was a song given to the band by Ulvaeus, since he had decided to record "Sunny Girl" for his band Hootenanny Singers' 1966 studio album Många Ansikten / Many Faces. It also features two hit singles, "Wedding" and "Consolation", which both reached peak position on the Kvällstoppen chart for 4 and 10 weeks respectively. The album itself peaked at number 12 on the same chart. Which at the time was a huge feat for an album, as it at the time was dominated by singles. This had only previously been achieved with the album Rubber Soul by the Beatles.

"Lady Lady" was released as a single in Belgium in 1968 by Columbia Records, backed by "Sunny Girl", a release which failed to chart. Both "The Birds In The Sky" and "Morning Comes After Night" had initially been recorded by a Swedish group called Vat 66 in 1966. These releases failed to chart. Vat 66 also recorded and released "Lady Lady" as a single in 1967.

Track listing

Personnel 
Hep Stars

 Svenne Hedlund – lead vocals, percussion
 Janne Frisk – rhythm and lead guitar, backing vocals
 Lennart Hegland – bass guitar, backing vocals
 Benny Andersson – various keyboard instruments, backing vocals
 Christer Pettersson – drums, percussion, backing vocals

Additional personnel

 Lennart Fernholm – bass guitar
 Gert Palmcrantz – producer

References 

1966 albums
Hep Stars albums